Nadia Petrova was the defending champion, but lost in the final to Tatiana Golovin.

Seeds
The top eight seeds received a bye into the second round.

Draw

Finals

Top half

Section 1

Section 2

Bottom half

Section 3

Section 4

External links
 ITF tournament edition details

Singles
Bausch and Lomb Championships